Jean-Marie Peretti (born 1946) (also known as Jean-Marc Peretti) is a French organizational theorist, Professor at the ESSEC business school and in the University of Corsica Pasquale Paoli, management consultant and author, known for his work on human resources management.

Peretti graduated from ESSEC in 1967 and received his PhD in Management at the Institute of Political Studies in Paris in 1969. After his graduation Peretti has been working as management consultant. He was president of the Institut International de l'Audit Social from 1991 to 2000, and President of the French Association of Human Resource Management from 2001 to 2004.

Books
Recent ones, in french
 Tous différents, gérer la diversité dans l'entreprise ouvrage collectif coordonné par JM Peretti, 2006, éditions de l'Organisation 
 Ressources humaines, 2006, Vuibert,  
 Tous DRH, 2006, éditions de l'Organisation, 
 FAQ ressources humaines -  Tout ce que vous souhaitez savoir, 2006, ed. Fonctions de l'entreprise 
 Dictionnaire des ressources humaines, 2005, Vuibert, 
 Tous reconnus, 2005, éditions de l'Organisation, 
 Les clés de l'équité dans l'entreprise, 2005, Forum international du management,

External links
  JM Peretti resume on the Essec site

1946 births
Living people
Academic staff of ESSEC Business School
French business theorists
Sciences Po alumni
Academic staff of the University of Corsica Pasquale Paoli